The Lucknow Gharānā, also known as "Purab Gharâna" for tabla, is a discipleship tradition ("gharana") with a tabla legacy and Kathak legacy. These two traditions are known for being one of the six major gharanas of tabla and three gharanas of kathak.

Exponents

Kathak
 Durga Prasad Mishra (c. 1800–1880), father and guru of Bindadin Maharaj and Kalka Prasad Mishra.
 Thakur Prasad Misha (c. 1800–1880), uncle and guru of Bindadin Maharaj and Kalka Prasad Mishra.
 Bindadin Maharaj (1830-1918), co-founder of the gharana. Disciple of father, Durga Prasad Mishra, and uncle, Thakur Prasad Mishra.
 Kalka Prasad Mishra (1842-1913), co-founder of the gharana. Disciple of father, Durga Prasad Mishra, and uncle, Thakur Prasad Mishra.
 Acchan Maharaj (1883-1960), son and disciple of father Kalka Prasad Mishra.
 Lacchu Maharaj (1901-1978), son and disciple of father Kalka Prasad Mishra.
 Shambhu Maharaj (1910-1970), son and disciple of father Kalka Prasad Mishra.
 Birju Maharaj (1938-2022), foremost kathak performer of the 20th Century. Son and disciple of Acchan Maharaj. Also learned from uncles Lacchu Maharaj and Shambhu Maharaj.

Tabla

 Miyan Bakshu
 Abid Hussain khan
 Wajid Hussain Khan
 Afaq Hussain Khan
 Ilmas Hussain Khan 
 Santosh Krishna Biswas
 Swapan Chaudhuri (b. 1945), disciple of Santosh Krishna Biswas.
 S. R. Chishti (b. 1965), disciple of Afaq Hussain Khan.
 Ustad Julfikar Hussain disciple of Khalifa Ustad Afaq Hussain khan.
 Pandit Swaraj Bhattacharya
 Pandit Ashok Maitra
 Sri Ujjal Roy

References

Tabla gharanas
Culture of Lucknow